Roaring River may refer to:

Rivers in Canada:
Roaring River (Manitoba)

Rivers in Jamaica:
 Roaring River (Jamaica)

Rivers in the United States:
 Roaring River (Missouri)
 Roaring River (North Carolina)
 Roaring River (Colorado), in Rocky Mountain National Park
 Roaring River (Tennessee)
 Roaring River (California), a tributary of the South Fork Kings River
 Roaring River (Clackamas River) in Oregon
 Roaring River (Crabtree Creek) in Oregon
 Roaring River (South Fork McKenzie River) in Oregon

Unincorporated communities in the United States:
 Roaring River, North Carolina

Other:
 Roaring River Park, Jamaica, a nature park formerly the Roaring River Estate, in Petersfield, Jamaica